Obreja is a commune in Caraș-Severin County, western Romania with a population of 3249. It is composed of four villages: Ciuta (Csuta), Iaz (Jász), Obreja and Var (Vár). It is situated in the historical region of Banat.

Natives
 Luca Novac
 Ilie Sârbu

References

Communes in Caraș-Severin County
Localities in Romanian Banat